Luang Prabang International Airport (Lao: ສະຫນາມບິນສາກົນຫຼວງພະບາງ),  is one of the few international airports in Laos. The second busiest airport in the country, it is a regional hub for international flights to Bangkok, Chiang Mai and Siem Reap and other cities such as Vientiane and Phongsali. The airport underwent significant expansion work in 2012–3, when it was upgraded and expanded, and the runway enlarged.

Airlines and destinations

Passenger

References

External links

Luang Prabang Airport Guide

Airports in Laos
Airport